Players and pairs who neither have high enough rankings nor receive wild cards may participate in a qualifying tournament held one week before the annual Wimbledon Tennis Championships.

Seeds

  Ģirts Dzelde /  Carl Limberger (first round)
  Lan Bale /  Andrew Kratzmann (qualified)
  Leander Paes /  Laurence Tieleman (qualified)
  Brian Devening /  Roger Smith (first round)
  Tommy Ho /  Pat Rafter (qualifying competition)
  Ellis Ferreira /  Richard Schmidt (second round)
  Nicola Bruno /  Brian Joelson (second round)
  David Nainkin /  Grant Stafford (first round)
  Roberto Saad /  Paul Wekesa (qualifying competition)
  Patrick Baur /  Fernon Wibier (first round)

Qualifiers

  Alex Rădulescu /  Mikael Stadling
  Lan Bale /  Andrew Kratzmann
  Leander Paes /  Laurence Tieleman
  Juan Garat /  Sándor Noszály
  David DiLucia /  Brian MacPhie

Qualifying draw

First qualifier

Second qualifier

Third qualifier

Fourth qualifier

Fifth qualifier

External links

1993 Wimbledon Championships – Men's draws and results at the International Tennis Federation

Men's Doubles Qualifying
Wimbledon Championship by year – Men's doubles qualifying